Richard L. Hayes Jr. is an American football coach. He is the head football coach at Fayetteville State University in Fayetteville, North Carolina, a position he has held since the 2016 season.

Hayes is the nephew of Bill Hayes, former football coach and college athletics administrator.

Head coaching record

References

External links
 Fayetteville State profile

Year of birth missing (living people)
Living people
American football defensive backs
Fayetteville State Broncos football coaches
North Carolina A&T Aggies football coaches
North Carolina A&T Aggies football players
Winston-Salem State Rams football coaches
High school football coaches in North Carolina
High school football coaches in South Carolina
African-American coaches of American football
African-American players of American football
20th-century African-American sportspeople
21st-century African-American sportspeople